Theory of Probability and Mathematical Statistics is a cover-to-cover translation into English of the Ukrainian scientific journal "Teoriya Imovirnostei ta Matematichna Statistika" which is published by Taras Shevchenko National University of Kyiv. It is published two times per year by the American Mathematical Society. The editor-in-chief is Volodymyr Korolyuk (Ukraine).

Abstracting and indexing
The journal is abstracted and indexed in the Emerging Sources Citation Index, Mathematical Reviews, Scopus, and Zentralblatt MATH.

References

External links

Statistics journals
Probability journals
English-language journals
Publications established in 2004
Biannual journals
American Mathematical Society academic journals